Harold Alton Gould (18 February 1926 – 2 July 2021) was an American anthropologist specializing in Indian society and civilization. He is an author of numerous books on various aspects of Indian society including the caste system, religion, politics and international relations.

Life and career 
Gould received his PhD in anthropology at the University of Saint Louis in 1959. From 1968 to 1991, he worked as a professor of anthropology at the University of Illinois at Urbana-Champaign and served as the director of its Center for Asian Studies. Since 1991, he has been a visiting professor in the Center for South Asian Studies at the University of Virginia.

Gould visited Lucknow University in India during 1954–55 as a Fulbright scholar, conducting anthropological field work in the village communities of the Faizabad district. Since then, he made numerous research trips to India, spending over 10 years in the country over a span of 50 years. His research encompasses every facet of Indian society and civilization, including rural society, caste, religion, local politics, electoral processes, and national and international politics.

Works 
Books
 The Hindu Caste System, Vol. 1: Sacralization of a Social Order (Delhi: Chanakya Publications, 1987), .
 The Hindu Caste System, Vol 2: Caste Adaptation in Modernizing Indian Society (Delhi: Chanakya Publications, 1988). .
 The Hindu Caste System, Vol. 3: Politics and Caste (Delhi: Chanakya Publications, 1990). .
 India Votes: Alliance Politics and Minority Government in the Ninth and Tenth General Elections (co-edited with Sumit Ganguly, Westview Press, 1993).
 The Hope and the Reality: US-Indian Relations from Roosevelt to Reagan (co-edited with Sumit Ganguly, Westview Press, 1992).
 Grass Roots Politics in India: Century of Political Evolution in Faizabad District (Oxford & IBH, 1995), .
 India and the United States in a Changing World (co-edited with Ashok Kapur, Y. K. Malik and Arthur G. Rubinoff, SAGE, 2002), .
 Sikhs, Swamis, Students and Spies: The India Lobby in the United States, 1900-1946 (SAGE, 2006), .
 The South Asia Story: The first sixty years of US relations with India and Pakistan (SAGE, 2010), .

Selected articles

Reception 
Robert I. Crane of the Syracuse University, reviewing Gould's The Hindu Caste System, Volume 1, calls it a "masterful study" of the highly complex Hindu system of caste with insightful and informed analysis. His discussion of "priests and contrapriests" contains stimulating ideas and guides the larger thrust of the volume. Also noteworthy for Crane is the chapter on Hindu jajmani system, with the best known evaluation of the jajmani relationships. However, Crane questions Gould's position on the primacy of religious value system and wonders if he might have overlooked the possibility of power-cum-economic interests having coopted the religious values.

Lloyd I. Rudolph of the University of Chicago, reviewing Gould's Grass Roots Politics in India, calls it a "masterful account" of a century of political evolution in the Faizabad district (from roughly 1869 when the Faizabad Municipal Board was established to the 1970 by-elections in the Tanda constituency). Gould's objective is to analyze and explain India's "political systems," how a political system of national proportions came into being and has functioned at the grass roots. Following the model of Paul Brass in Factional Politics in an Indian State,
Gould views the Indian National Congress as a coalition of state parties, and the state parties themselves as coalitions of semi-independent district party organizations. It is at the district level that Congress party organizations interact with the traditional societies. Gould's principal vehicle for explaining the nexus between the traditional society and the party politics is "caste demographics." Gould, being a pioneer in the analysis of the "desacralized" caste system (caste delinked from religious and ritual dimensions and viewed as an "ethnic group"), shows how caste can, and has, become the vehicle for political participation and social transformation. Rudolph finds Gould's analysis powerful and persuasive, but wonders how much a district level analysis can be used to explain India's political system. Do we not see the influence of ideology, leadership and agency (taken as examples of "top down" phenomena) as much as the caste demographics in shaping the local politics?

References

External links 
 Harold Gould's publications in the Economic & Political Weekly

1926 births
2021 deaths
American anthropologists
American Indologists
Saint Louis University alumni
University of Illinois Urbana-Champaign faculty
University of Virginia faculty